The year 1986 was the 205th year of the Rattanakosin Kingdom of Thailand. It was the 41st year in the reign of King Bhumibol Adulyadej (Rama IX), and is reckoned as year 2533 in the Vajiralongkorn

Incumbents
King: Bhumibol Adulyadej 
Prime Minister: Prem Tinsulanonda
Supreme Patriarch: Ariyavangsagatayana VII

Events

January

February

March

April

May

June

July

August

September

October

November

December

Births

Deaths

See also
 2019in Thai television
 List of Thai films of 1986

References

External links

 
Years of the 20th century in Thailand
Thailand
Thailand
1980s in Thailand